Tour de Molvccas(abbreviated TdM) is an annual professional road bicycle racing stage race held in Maluku, Indonesia. The race is part of the UCI Asia Tour and was classified by the International Cycling Union (UCI) as a 2.2 category race. The participants pass through four areas of the Maluku province namely West Seram Regency, Central Maluku Regency, East Seram Regency and Ambon.

Past winners

2017 Tour de Molvccas
The first international cycling competition Tour de Molvccas  (TdM) 2017 was held September 18 and end on September 23.  Cyclists from 20 countries participated the race of five stages with a total distance of 713.7 kilometers. Four stages of the race were located on Seram Island while the other one is located on Ambon.

References

 
Cycle races in Indonesia
UCI Asia Tour races
Recurring sporting events established in 2017
2017 establishments in Indonesia